The Old Custom House is a building in what is now Old Montreal, which served as Montreal's first custom house. The building was completed in 1836, designed by Montreal architect John Ostell in the Palladian revival style. It is a National Historic Site of Canada. It now houses the Pointe-à-Callière Museum's gift shop.

Gallery

References

External links
 

Government buildings in Montreal
Custom houses
Government buildings completed in 1838
John Ostell buildings
Museums in Montreal
Old Montreal
Palladian Revival architecture in Canada